Australian Aviation is an online and print aviation publication which provides information regarding aviation. Aviation Australia predominately focuses on aviation incidents on its website but provides a variety of detailed books available for purchase.

History
Founded by Jim Thorn in 1977, Australian Aviation was established as Australian Aviation & Defence Review. The magazine was printed quarterly in 1979, and became monthly in 1990. It maintained monthly publication until 2019. 

Gerard Frawley succeeded Thorn as managing editor of the magazine in March 2005 after Phantom Media Pty Ltd purchased Australian Aviation. In 2018, the publication was acquired by Aviator Media and Australian Aviation fell under the editorial guidance of Steve Gibbons. Australian Aviation was subsequently purchased by Momentum Media in 2020. Phillip Tarrant is the current editor.

Current publication
Australian Aviation is available online and in print. In 2020, the monthly print distribution was reduced to bi-monthly, and then to four times per year. The magazine covers a wide range of aviation-related areas, from civil aviation to defence, safety, airlines, airports, as well as general aviation and aircraft reviews. The digital transition also saw the magazine move from the creation of original content to the curation of media releases and content from various online sources..

References

External links
 Official website

1977 establishments in Australia
Monthly magazines published in Australia
Aviation magazines
Magazines established in 1977
Magazines published in Sydney
Bi-monthly magazines published in Australia
Quarterly magazines published in Australia